Events in the year 2023 in the Gambia.

Incumbents 
 President: Adama Barrow
 Vice-President of the Gambia: Badara Joof (until 17 January); Muhammad B.S. Jallow onwards
 Chief Justice: Hassan Bubacar Jallow

Events 

Ongoing — COVID-19 pandemic in the Gambia

 13 May – 2023 Gambian local elections
 24 February – Gambian president Adama Barrow appoints Muhammad B.S. Jallow as the country's new vice-president after the previous one, Badara Joof, died last month in India.

Deaths 
 17 January — Badara Joof, 65, politician, vice-president (since 2022).
 25 January — Edrissa Marong, 27, long-distance runner.

References 

 
Gambia
Gambia
2020s in the Gambia
Years of the 21st century in the Gambia